The High Commissioner of the United Kingdom to Belize is the United Kingdom's foremost diplomatic representative in Belize, and head of the UK's diplomatic mission in Belize.

As fellow members of the Commonwealth of Nations, diplomatic relations between the United Kingdom and Belize are at governmental level, rather than between Heads of State.  Thus, the countries exchange High Commissioners rather than ambassadors.

Heads of mission

High Commissioners to Belize
1981–1984: Francis Trew
1984–1987: John Crosby
1987–1991: Peter Thomson
1991–1995: David Mackilligin
1995–1998: Gordon Baker
1998–2001: Timothy David
2001–2004: Philip Priestley
2004–2007: Alan Jones
2007–2008: John Yapp
2008–2013: Patrick Ashworth
2013–2018: Peter Hughes

2018–: Claire Evans

References

External links
UK and Belize – British High Commission Belmopan

Belize
 
United Kingdom